Aristeus antennatus is a species of deep-water prawn, commonly known as red prawn or prawns from Palamós. The exact same crustacean is also fished in the Mediterranean Spanish towns of Dénia, Garrucha and Huelva. It presents a very intense red color and it is valued for its fine, firm and tasty meat. It is fished with the technique of bottom trawling and in summer they are usually found more exemplaries and bigger.

History

The prawn traditionally has been fished off the Palamós coasts and in other Catalan coastal towns as by example Blanes, Arenys, Roses or of the coast of Tarragona. Towards 1950 fishermen come from the south of Catalonia and of the Valencian Country they introduced the technology of fish trawling in Palamós and some very important fishing-grounds of shrimp were discovered. Since then it has gained importance in the Comfraria de Pescadors de Palamós (Fishing Confraternity), and nowadays it has achieved renown and recognition.

References 

Edible crustaceans
Commercial crustaceans
Animal-based seafood
Cuisine of Empordà
Taxa named by Antoine Risso